Hannah Afriyie (born 21 December 1951) is a retired Ghanaian track and field athlete. She won two gold medals in the 100 and 200 metres sprints at the 1978 All-Africa Games held in Algiers.

Afriyie reached the quarter finals of the 100 metres and the 200 metres at the 1972 Summer Olympics.

In the 1977 West African games in Lagos, she won the silver medal in the 100 metres.

References

External links

1951 births
Living people
Ghanaian female sprinters
Olympic athletes of Ghana
Athletes (track and field) at the 1972 Summer Olympics
Athletes (track and field) at the 1974 British Commonwealth Games
Athletes (track and field) at the 1978 Commonwealth Games
Commonwealth Games medallists in athletics
Commonwealth Games bronze medallists for Ghana
African Games gold medalists for Ghana
African Games medalists in athletics (track and field)
Athletes (track and field) at the 1978 All-Africa Games
Olympic female sprinters
Accra Girls Senior High School alumni
Medallists at the 1974 British Commonwealth Games